This is a list of Brandy products.

Books

Real-Life Cinderella: The Story of Brandy
Author: Joal Ryan
Pages: 95
Country: United States
Language: English
Publisher: Delacorte Books for Young Readers
Release: 1998

Real-Life Cinderella: The Story of Brandy is a look at actress/singer Brandy Norwood and her rise to fame, including her time on the long-running UPN show Moesha.  As well as chronicling her career, the book offers a look at the television and music industries.

The reader is given a sense of what was faced by young stars trying to come up in the mid-1990s.  The author explores the hard work that went into marketing Brandy; what worked for her, and how she (and others) pulled it off. Glimpses are given of Brandy's early love life; crushes, and parental intervention. The book has lists at the end, including a discography, a list of Brandy's TV and film credits, and a list of awards bestowed upon her.

Brandy: An Intimate Look 
Author: Karu F. Daniels
Country: United States
Language: English
Publisher: NVU Editions/Team Power Publishing
Release: 1999

Brandy: An Intimate Look is a look at Brandy, as shared by a personal friend of hers.  It is a collection of facts and personal insight, and includes a look at Brandy's family. Each chapter explores an aspect of the life and career of Norwood.

The book has colour photographs of Brandy, and a collection of quotes from her.

The book features a list of Brandy's musical, television, and movie appearances.

DVDs

Ultima Hair
In 2005, Brandy became the spokesperson for Ultima, a company for hair weaves and wigs. As of 2012, she no longer represents them.

Toys/games

Dolls 
The Brandy doll are dolls made in her likeness.

In 1999, Mattel released the Brandy Doll. The first doll featured Brandy in a reddish brown blouse with an orange Mongolian faux fur scarf around the collar. The bottom half includes a long orange skirt with a pair of gold and orange Pedal pushers pants with gold wedge pumps. This doll also comes with a microphone, and a gold platform for brandy. An Autographed poster copy is included. Because of the success of this doll, a second doll "Super Star Brandy" was released. This doll featured Brandy In a colorful African abstract patterned spaghetti strap top with a neon green jacket and chunky platform heals to match, with purple faux leather pants. On the back of the "Super Star Brandy" doll box in the bottom left hand corner features a sneak peek of all Mattel brandy doll designs including a "Coming Soon" tag under the Singing Holiday Brandy Doll released in 2000. Two more dolls followed, including another "Super Star Brandy" in 2000 and a Stylin' Hair Brandy Doll also released in 2000. This doll also includes an autographed poster copy. Mattel has two unreleased Brandy dolls, Brandy as Cinderella from the ABC's Wonderful World of Disney TV movie Rodgers & Hammerstein's Cinderella and a Final "Super Star Brandy" with a gold microphone.  Millions of the dolls were distributed and sold from (1999-2003) they were one of the biggest selling toys for Mattel.

Video game

References 

Products